Labdia aphanogramma is a moth in the family Cosmopterigidae. It is found in southern India.

References

External links
Natural History Museum Lepidoptera generic names catalog

Labdia
Moths described in 1931